Melanthera micrantha (formerly Lipochaeta micrantha), known by the common name Kauai nehe, is a rare species of flowering plant in the family Asteraceae.

Distribution
The plant is endemic to Hawaii, where it is known only from the island of Kauai.

It grows on slopes and in gulches in forested habitat. There are seven populations for a total of fewer than 1100 individuals.

Description
Melanthera micrantha is sprawling perennial herb. It produces thin trailing stems with 'fernlike' foliage on compound pedate leaves.

It produces daisylike yellow flower heads on long stems.

Subspecies
Melanthera micrantha subsp. exigua — (Nutt.) W.L. Wagner & H. Rob.
Melanthera micrantha subsp. micrantha — (Nutt.) A. Gray.

Conservation
It is federally listed as an endangered species of the United States.  The main threat to the species is the loss and degradation of its habitat caused by feral ungulates and non-native plants.

References

External links
USDA Plants Profile for Melanthera micrantha (as Lipochaeta micrantha) — Kauai nehe

micrantha
Endemic flora of Hawaii
Biota of Kauai